Little Flower Church, Kaprassery is a Syro-Malabar Catholic Church, in the village of Kaprassery, India. It is dedicated to Saint Thérèse of Lisieux. It is located close to the Cochin International Airport.

Parish

About the Parish 
The Little Flower Church, Kaprassery is under the Ernakulam Angamaly Arch Diocese and Rev. Fr. Paul Kottackal (Sr.) is the present vicar of the parish. He belongs to OSH congregation and previously worked as assistant vicar at Angamaly Basilica. There are about 230 families under the parish.

History

Before this church, Kaprasserians depended on Akaparambu Catholic Church for their religious practices. Later as directed by the vicar of Agaparambu Church, a tutor started visiting Kaprassery for teaching catechism. Then a chapel was built for Sunday school teaching. Gradually it became a Christian religious center with a small group of people from the areas of Kaprassery, and many surrounding areas. With the arrival of Fr. James Chaveli, a new church has been constructed at the center of Kaprassery village.  With the donations and effort of many people, they constructed a new church.

Syro-Malabar Religious Houses In the Parish

CMC Udhayabhavan
This is the only religious house that comes in the Little Flower Church boundary. It is run by CMC sisters. The house is known as CMC Udhayabhavan convent. There are about ten regular sisters and many often visits the house. This house is under the Andhra Province of CMC sisters and it is considered as a transit house due to the closeness to the International airport, railway stations and bus terminals.

Organisations/Activities

Catechism 
Since Catechism is considered as the primary and integral part of the parish, it is given a prominent role in the church. The Catechism classes are conducted for all students from first standard and 12th standard and it is affiliated to Department of Catechises and Moral Education of Ernakulam Angamaly Archdiocese. These students are divided into six sections. They are: Pre communion, Communion, Post communion, Pre confirmation, Confirmation and Youth. Further they are divided into different classes. Presently there are more than 250 students in the church who undergo their faith formation through Catechism. Under the guidance of parish priests, head master and animator around ten teachers act as faith formers during these Sunday classes.

K.C.Y.M
This is a chapter of state level youth organization which focuses on empowerment of catholic youth from Kerala. Being a youth led movement it aims at creating a synergy between youth culture and spiritual values. It is important during this time as the society seeks to empower the youth to be able to integrate spiritual values such as love, service and compassion into the modern lifestyle of today's youth. The organization takes an active part in all parish activities and cultural programs conducted by the Church.

L.F. Conference (Vincent De Paul)
This is the Kaprassery Chapter of international Roman Catholic voluntary organization dedicated to tackling poverty and disadvantage by providing direct practical assistance to anyone in need; addressing social and material needs in all its many forms.

Major Festivals

Little Flower Parish fiesta 
Parish fiesta days in Kaprassery brings a hundred and one memories; some happy and some sad. It reminds of the well decorated and illuminated face of parish church, old and familiar faces of parishioners and people in the distant beyond, some lost and half forgotten.
Parish was established in the year 1976. It is named Little Flower Church after the Saint Therese of Lisieux (LittleFlower). 
Kaprassery celebrates its parish fiesta every first weekend of February in honour of her patroness Saint Therese of Lisieux (Little Flower) and of Saint Sebastian. This most awaited weekend is preceded by nine days evening novena and holy mass. These days, you will find the pious and devoted Kaprasserians offering their prayers, thanks giving for the blessings granted upon their family and nation by the loving God with the intercession of our Lady.
The celebration is doubly blessed and become more significant in the parish church which has been the center of the life of a Kaprasserian. By the end of ninth day, folks decorate their frontage of house and village roads with tender coconut leaves and with the plantain trunk. Soon the much awaited weekend arrives and celebration begins by hosting papal flag in front of the church and holy mass follows. Later in the evening parishioners comes up with a bunch of beautiful cultural programs and the real celebration begins as each and every devotee and guest is welcomed in the heart and homes of village folks in the unique charm and Kaprassery hospitality. Saturday procession, after celebrating the holy mass, is something everyone participates with lot of devotion and pride.
The sharing of laughters, all the eating and the drinking! What a weekend! But by Sunday evening, the host smiles with pride and joy for another merry making that had soon come to pass. Once again memories are made in the hearts of each Kaprasserians. The activities are set through the leadership of parish priest and parish fest committee.

Onanilavu 
It is an annual cultural show organised by Kerala Catholic Youth Movement Kaprassery Chapter (K.C.Y.M.), as a part of Onam celebrations. It is a platform for all the Kaprasserians to showcase their talents and also to be a part of delicious cultural fiesta. It is organised at Little Flower Church Parish Hall.

The Holy Rosary Month 
Kaprasserians are popular for their devotion towards Mother Mary. Just like all the Catholics around the world, they spent October as the month of the Holy Rosary. They start the month with daily family unit level Rosary meetings at various homes in the evening. Towards the end of the month, exactly, for the last ten days, they all come together at the parish in the evening for the Holy Mass and the Holy Rosary thereafter. On the last day youth of the parish, under the leadership of K.C.Y.M., leads the holy rosary and everyone part after a love treat arranged by youth at parish hall. During these ten days K.C.Y.M. organizes a Marian Quiz competition for the parish families, with the objective to enable the devotees to know more and stay close to Mother Mary.

Gallery

References

External links

 "Incredible Kaprassery"
 "Little Flower Church"
  "Festival of Kaprassery"
 "CMC Udaya Bhavan Convent"
 "Parish at a Glance on Ernakulam Angamaly Archdiocese"

Churches in Ernakulam district
Syro-Malabar Catholic church buildings
Eastern Catholic churches in Kerala
Churches completed in 1976